Ginghamsburg Church is a multi-site church located in Tipp City, Ohio, a suburb thirteen miles north of Dayton, Ohio.

History 
Ginghamsburg Church was founded by a Methodist circuit rider, B.W. Day, in 1863 in the village of Ginghamsburg, Ohio. As a small church, until the 1920s it was part of a four-church circuit for a part-time preacher. From the 1920s on, students from a Dayton-based seminary served as part-time pastors for the congregation. Senior Pastor Michael Slaughter was appointed to Ginghamsburg in 1979 as the church's first full-time pastor. At the time, the church averaged approximately 90 people in attendance. Since Slaughter's arrival, the mission of the church has been to "win the lost and set the oppressed free," leading to the church's exponential growth. Today, approximately 5,000 people are on Ginghamsburg's campuses each week. Slaughter has become a leading figure in the missional church movement and a popular author and speaker, and has repeatedly been named one of the most influential Christians in America.

In the late 1980s and early 1990s, Ginghamsburg gained national recognition as an innovator in small group ministry and it has since continued to be well-known for its small group ministry.

It was also an early frontrunner of cyberministry, or ministry via the Internet, and currently has one of the largest church internet ministries in the world. The church's website and online ministry have received national attention from a media outlets such as The Wall Street Journal, Fox News, and The Dallas Morning News. A non-profit organization (see below) was also formed by members of the Ginghamsburg cyberministry team to help other churches develop their websites and online ministries.

In the late 1990s and early 2000s Ginghamsburg became known as a leader of the church "media reformation," which was a movement to incorporate video, onscreen graphics, creative lighting, and other audio-visual elements into worship services to create a multisensory worship experience. Kim Miller, who oversees Ginghamsburg's worship design, has become a popular speaker and author on multisensory worship, writing several books on the subject. The church's worship design has received attention in The Wall Street Journal and Christianity Today and on Fox News.

Since 2005, Ginghamsburg Church invested over $6.1 million into sustainable relief projects in Darfur, Sudan through an initiative called The Sudan Project. The church first developed the initiative after Slaughter read about the War in Darfur in the early 2000s. After the situation in Darfur was named by the United Nations as the worst humanitarian crisis in the world, which resulted in a genocide, extreme poverty for millions, and a refugee crisis, Slaughter urged the congregation to get involved. Ginghamsburg partnered with the United Methodist Committee on Relief, which has helped the church use the funds to implement sustainable agriculture, safe water, sanitation, child development, and child protection projects in Darfur. The projects are now serving more than 250,000 Darfuri people and over 200 schools have been built.

Every year the church holds a "Christmas is Not Your Birthday" miracle offering during the Christmas season to raise funds for the project. As a result of the annual miracle offering, Slaughter authored a book calling on Christians to reject self-centered, consumeristic approaches to the holiday season and remember what he perceives as the true meaning of Christmas. In April 2010 and December 2012 the church's work in Darfur was featured on PBS's Religion & Ethics Newsweekly. The church's work in Darfur has also been chronicled by The New York Times, Huffington Post, Beliefnet, Christianity Today, and The Christian Century.

The church developed relief efforts in New Orleans following Hurricane Katrina, garnering a front page cover story in The Times-Picayune and articles in the Houston Chronicle and The Washington Post. As of March 2012 the church has sent over seventy teams to the city to assist in rebuilding efforts.

In 2010 Ginghamsburg held its first annual Change the World Weekend, a churchwide event in which church members commit to a weekend of community service. The idea led to the United Methodist denomination making it a denomination-wide event in which thousands of churches around the world participate in a weekend of community service. The event corresponded with the release of Slaughter's book Change the World: Recovering the Mission and Message of Jesus.

Dennis Miller became the Senior Pastor in August 2022.

Campuses 
The church's youth center, The Avenue, is also located at the Main Campus and includes a coffee shop, stage area for concerts, classrooms, basketball courts, fitness center, and game loft. Hundreds of teenagers from the Dayton area visit The Avenue weekly for spiritual classes as well as outreach events.

The South Campus houses The Ark, which is a practicum center for training events and is also the original Ginghamsburg Church building. The Discipleship Center, also located on the South Campus, served as the primary church building after the congregation had outgrown The Ark in the mid-1980s until the move to the Main Campus in 1994. It is now the headquarters for Ginghamsburg's New Path Outreach ministries, a 501(c)(3) non-profit that operates a food pantry, car, furniture, clothing, medical equipment, pet care ministries to those in need in surrounding communities, as well as the New Creation Counseling Center. The New Path car and furniture ministry barn, which houses the cars and furniture that the ministry distributes, is also located at the South Campus.

The Fort McKinley Campus became part of Ginghamsburg Church in July 2008. Prior to July 2008, Fort McKinley was a separate United Methodist congregation, located in an economically-challenged Dayton neighborhood. The church had dwindled to approximately 40 people in attendance weekly before voting to merge with Ginghamsburg. The church now averages about 60 in weekly attendance and has an active community revitalization project known as Project Neighborhood. In March 2012 Ginghamsburg also started another urban campus, located in Trotwood, Ohio. However the campus is now closed.

Non-profit organizations 
Ginghamsburg Church houses four 501(c)(3) non-profit organizations founded by Ginghamsburg members.

New Path Outreach operates nineteen separate community service ministries within the Dayton area, including two food pantries and car, furniture, clothing, medical equipment, pet care, rent/utility assistance, and other ministries. New Path currently serves over 40,000 people in the Dayton area. New Path also operates two stores in the Dayton area. The first store, Anna's closet, located in nearby Troy sells gently-used clothes and home furnishings. The second store, The Gleaning Place, which is located in neighboring West Milton, sells home furnishings. Both stores are run entirely by unpaid servants and supported solely by donations with all revenue going to support ongoing New Path ministries.

New Creation Counseling Center provides counseling to community members, regardless of their ability to pay.

The Clubhouse (Dreambuilders) After-School Ministry has seven Dayton-area locations where more than 400 trained teenagers each year tutor, mentor, and play with at-risk children, providing safe and educational alternatives to children being home alone after school or during summer break. The Clubhouse program was awarded a Point of Light award from President George H. W. Bush and the Presidential Voluntary Action Award from President Bill Clinton, among other awards.

Another non-profit, Web-Empowered Church, helps churches and parachurch organizations develop their websites, improve their online presence, and better utilize online resources by offering software help and consulting, as well as a number of classes, tutorials, and workshops. The non-profit was founded by Mark Stephenson, who was Director of CyberMinistry and Technology at Ginghamsburg from 1998 to 2010.

Conferences and events 

In 2009, the church hosted a special event on the War in Darfur with John Prendergast and Omer Ismail. The event was broadcast live on the Christian Communications Network to churches around the country. Actress Mira Sorvino, who is also a United Nations Goodwill Ambassador, was scheduled to attend the event but had to cancel due to pregnancy.

The church also sponsors and hosts a number of other conferences, seminars, and events annually, sometimes in conjunction with United Theological Seminary, a United Methodist seminary located just outside Dayton.

In April 2012, as a sign of its new commitment to revitalize the city of Dayton, which has been named one of the ten fastest-dying cities in the country, Ginghamsburg held its annual Easter service at the University of Dayton Arena.

References

External links 
 

Methodist megachurches in the United States
Religious organizations established in 1863
Tipp City, Ohio
United Methodist churches in Ohio
Churches in Miami County, Ohio
1863 establishments in Ohio